China National Highway 325 (G325, Guangnan Highway) runs west from Guangzhou, Guangdong towards Nanning, Guangxi. It is 868 kilometres in length.

Route and distance

See also 
 China National Highways
 AH1

Transport in Guangdong
Transport in Guangxi
325